Richard is a village in the Canadian province of Saskatchewan within the Rural Municipality of Douglas No. 436 and Census Division No. 16.

History 
Richard was founded in 1900 by Emile Richard. He was born in 1860, and died in Montreal in 1942. He moved out of Richard, Saskatchewan when the Richard House "Acadia" burnt down in 1935.

The Richard post office was established in 1904. Richard incorporated as a village on October 11, 1916.

At one time, Richard consisted of the following buildings: original Richard Ranch Building (1901), Patrick Labreque's store (later changed to Richard Trading post), Emile Richard's Barn, a Grain Elevator (opened in 1915), H. G. Grahams post office, Livery Barn, Richard Hotel, Emile Richard's brick home and garage (1917), CO-OP store (later Symonds Hardware), Mrs. Florence's Gift Shoppe, Richard Bank, Ernest McEwen home, H.P Voke house, Kokesh and Poeppings Garage, Richard C.N.R. Station, Skwara's Store, Town Hall, Corner Store, Colin Campbell's Store, Cafe, Haight House.

The only one of these buildings standing today is the post office. Over the years, many of these buildings have been purchased and moved out of town.

Demographics 

Government 
The current mayor is Merilyn Wawryk.

See also 
 List of communities in Saskatchewan
 Villages of Saskatchewan

References

Villages in Saskatchewan
Douglas No. 436, Saskatchewan
Division No. 16, Saskatchewan
Populated places established in 1900